David Garner may refer to:
David Garner (chemist) (born 1941), British chemist
David Garner (artist) (born 1958), Welsh installation artist
David McNiven Garner (1928–2016), New Zealand research physicist
David Garner (composer) (born 1954), American composer